Katrineholm Municipality is a municipality in Södermanland County in southeast Sweden. Its seat is located in the city of Katrineholm.

The present municipality was created in 1971, when the City of Katrineholm (instituted in 1917) was amalgamated with surrounding rural municipalities.

The thirty-first Swedish Prime Minister Göran Persson, while originally from the neighboring municipality of Vingåker, was once the municipal chairman (mayor) of Katrineholm.

Geography

Aspen (Julita) lake

Localities
Bie
Björkvik
Flodafors
Forssjö
Katrineholm (seat)
Sköldinge
Strångsjö
Valla
Äsköping

Elections

Riksdag
These are the results of the Riksdag elections in Katrineholm Municipality since the 1972 municipal reform. The results of the Sweden Democrats were not published at a municipal level from between 1988 and 1998 by SCB because of the party's small size nationwide at the time.

Blocs

This lists the relative strength of the socialist and centre-right blocs since 1973, but parties not elected to the Riksdag are inserted as "other", including the Sweden Democrats results from 1988 to 2006, but also the Christian Democrats pre-1991 and the Greens in 1982, 1985 and 1991. The sources are identical to the table above. The coalition or government mandate marked in bold formed the government after the election. New Democracy got elected in 1991 but are still listed as "other" due to the short lifespan of the party. "Elected" is the total number of percentage points from the municipality that went to parties who were elected to the Riksdag.

Demographics

2022
This is a demographic table based on Katrineholm Municipality's electoral districts in the 2022 Swedish general election sourced from SVT's election platform, in turn taken from SCB official statistics.

Residents include everyone registered as living in the district, regardless of age or citizenship status. Valid voters indicate Swedish citizens above the age of 18 who therefore can vote in general elections. Left vote and right vote indicate the result between the two major blocs in said district in the 2022 general election. Employment indicates the share of people between the ages of 20 and 64 who are working taxpayers. Foreign background denotes residents either born abroad or with two parents born outside of Sweden. Median income is the received monthly income through either employment, capital gains or social grants for the median adult above 20, also including pensioners in Swedish kronor. College graduates indicates any degree accumulated after high school.

In total there were 34,714 residents, of whom 25,962 were Swedish citizens of voting age. 52.3% voted for the left coalition and 46.4% for the right coalition.

References
Nationalencyklopedin

External links

Katrineholm Municipality - Official site

Municipalities of Södermanland County